The Museum of Contemporary Art, University of São Paulo (Portuguese, Museu de Arte Contemporânea da Universidade de São Paulo) is a contemporary art museum located in the main campus of the University of São Paulo, in São Paulo, Brazil, and in Ibirapuera Park, in the same city. It is one of the largest art museums in the country.

History
The museum was inaugurated in 1963, when the Brazilian industrialist and art collector Francisco Matarazzo Sobrinho, founder of the São Paulo Museum of Modern Art, decided to extinguish this museum and donate all of its holdings, along with his and his wife's private collection, to the University of São Paulo.

Collection
The museum houses one of the largest and most comprehensive collections of 20th-century Western art in Latin America, with more than 8,000 works, comprising the most important artists, art movements, and tendencies of modern and contemporary art. Among many others, it keeps important artworks by Amedeo Modigliani, Umberto Boccioni, Marc Chagall, Pablo Picasso, Jean Metzinger, Joan Miró, Wassily Kandinsky, Tarsila do Amaral, Candido Portinari, Ismael Nery and Anita Malfatti.

External links

 Official site 

Art museums and galleries in Brazil
Museums in São Paulo
Art museums established in 1963
Museum of Contemporary Art, University of Sao Paulo
University of São Paulo